Chassagne, La Chassagne and de la Chassagne may refer to:

Toponyme 
 Chassagne, Puy-de-Dôme, commune in Puy-de-Dôme
 Chassagne-Montrachet, commune in Côte-d'Or
 Chassagne-Saint-Denis, commune in Doubs
 La Chassagne, commune in Jura
 La Chassagne, lieu-dit in Ladapeyre, Creuse
 La Chassagne, lieu-dit in Onnens, Vaud, Switzerland

People 
 Jean Chassagne (1881–1947), French racing driver
 Maurice Chassagne (1880–1963), French botanist
 Micheline Chassagne, better known as Micheline Presle, French actress
 Nicolas Chassagne (born 1978), French musician
 Paul Chassagne (born 1932), French biathlete
 Raymond Chassagne (1924–2013), Haitian poet
 Régine Chassagne (born 1977), Canadian musician and singer
 Yvette Chassagne (1922–2007), French politician and official
 Pierre Perrin de Chassagne (born 1950), French poet and literary critic
 Julie d'Assier de la Chassagne (1741–1818), French poet

Architecture 
 Château de la Chassagne, a castle in the commune of Saint-Vincent-Bragny, Saône-et-Loire, France
 Château de la Chassagne, a castle in the commune of Neuville-les-Dames, Ain, France
 Château de la Chassagne, a castle in Saint-Hilaire-le-Château, Creuse, Nouvelle-Aquitaine, France
 Château la Chassagne, a castle in the communes of Fleurey-sur-Ouche and Sainte-Marie-sur-Ouche, Côte-d'Or, France
 Château la Chassagne, a castle in the commune of Ladapeyre, Creuse, Nouvelle-Aquitaine, France
 Église Saint-Pierre de Chassagne, a Roman Catholic church in the commune of Chassagne, Puy-de-Dôme, France
 Tour Chassagne, one of two office skyscrapers located in La Défense, Nanterre, Hauts-de-Seine, Paris, France

See also 
 15037 Chassagne, asteroid
 Chassagne-Montrachet wine, wine from the communes of Chassagne-Montrachet and Remigny in Côte de Beaune of Burgundy

Surnames of French origin
French-language surnames